Boris Samorodov (1931-2016) was an international speedway rider from the Soviet Union.

Speedway career 
Samorodov became a World Champion after winning the gold medal at the 1967 Individual Ice Speedway World Championship. He also reached the final of the Speedway World Championship in the 1963 Individual Speedway World Championship.

World final appearances

Individual Ice Speedway World Championship
1966 -  2 rounds, 5th - 35pts
1967 –  Ufa & Moscow – Champion – 57pts
1968 -  2 rounds, 3rd - 51pts
1969 -  Inzell, 5th - 10pts
1973 –  Inzell, 2nd – 25pts
1974 –  Nässjö, 5th – 10pts

Individual World Championship
 1963 –  London, Wembley Stadium – 4th – 11pts
 1964 -  Gothenburg, Ullevi - 4th - 11pts

World Team Cup
 1964 -  Abensberg, Abensberg Stadion (with Igor Plekhanov / Gennady Kurilenko / Yuri Chekranov) - 2nd - 25pts (3)
 1966 -  Wrocław, Olympic Stadium (with Viktor Trofimov / Igor Plekhanov / Farid Szajnurov) - 2nd - 25pts (10)
 1967 -  Malmö, Malmö Stadion (with Igor Plekhanov / Gabdrakhman Kadyrov / Viktor Trofimov / Farid Szajnurov) - 3rd= - 19pts (3)

References 

1931 births
2016 deaths
Russian speedway riders
Sportspeople from Yaroslavl Oblast